Eupithecia paupera is a moth in the family Geometridae. It is found in China.

References

Moths described in 1982
paupera
Moths of Asia